Welay Berhe (born 22 October 2001) is an Ethiopian racing cyclist, who currently rides for UCI WorldTeam .

Career
After leaving  in August 2021 he rejoined the team for the 2022 season. Berhe spent Stages 2 and 3 of the Istrian Spring Trophy in the break-away. In Stage 2 he won the six mountain points on the final climb of the day, then on stage 3 while in the break he won the first mountain sprint and secured himself the Mountain jersey. At the Tour de l'Avenir Berhe crashed during the sprint for Stage 6 after a Norwegian rider fell in front of him. Berhe continued the race with minor injuries.
Berhe signed a three-year deal to ride for UCI WorldTeam  from 2023.

Major results
Sources:
2018
 1st  Time trial, National Junior Road Championships
2019
 African Junior Road Championships
1st  Team time trial
1st  Time trial
4th Road race
 1st  Time trial, National Junior Road Championships
2022
 1st Grand Prix Crevoisier
 1st Radklassiker Chur-Arosa
 1st  Mountains classification Istrian Spring Trophy
 4th Piccolo Giro di Lombardia
 4th GP de la Pédale Romande
 4th GP Cham-Hagendorn
 6th Grand Prix L'Echappée
 6th GP Vorarlberg
 7th Overall Giro della Valle d'Aosta
 8th Tour du Jura Suisse

References

External links

2001 births
Living people
Ethiopian male cyclists